Apocalipstick may refer to:

 Apocalipstick, part of the comic book series The Invisibles
 Apocalipstick (album), a 2017 album by Cherry Glazerr